Aurica Bărăscu ( Chiriţă, born 21 September 1974 in Nicorești, Galați) is a Romanian rower.

References

External links 
 
 
 
 

1974 births
Living people
People from Galați County
Romanian female rowers
Rowers at the 2000 Summer Olympics
Rowers at the 2004 Summer Olympics
Olympic gold medalists for Romania
Olympic rowers of Romania
Olympic medalists in rowing
Medalists at the 2004 Summer Olympics
World Rowing Championships medalists for Romania
European Rowing Championships medalists